Telera is a white bread made from wheat flour, yeast, water and salt, used in various Mexican sandwiches. It is about sixteen centimeters long, flattened and oval shaped with two longitudinal deep marks at the top from side to side. In its outer layer, it is golden and commonly soft, and in its inner part, it is white and dense crumb.  Mexican tortas are prepared with this bread.

See also
 Telera (Spanish bread)
 List of breads

References
 Muñoz, Zurita.(2013). Diccionario enciclopédico de la gastronomía mexicana. Ed. Larousse. 

Mexican breads